Blackcastle Hill is an Iron Age hill fort south of Innerwick, East Lothian, Scotland. The fort has a single defensive bank.

External links
RCAHMS entry on Blackcastle Hill
Gazetteer for Scotland webpage on the Innerwick area, including Blackcastle Hill

See also
Traprain Law hillfort
Chesters Hill Fort
White Castle, East Lothian
Black Castle, East Lothian
List of places in East Lothian

Mountains and hills of East Lothian
Hill forts in Scotland
History of East Lothian
Archaeological sites in East Lothian
Scheduled monuments in Scotland